ALA.NI (born 9 June 1993) is a musician from London, England.

Career
ALA.NI released her first album, You & I, in 2017 on No Format!. The album was written a cappella on her iPad. ALA.NI released her second album in 2020 titled Acca.

Personal life
ALA.NI's parents are both originally from Grenada. Her great uncle was Leslie Hutchinson, one of the popular cabaret singers of the 1920s and 1930s.

References

Musicians from London
1993 births
Living people